Pseudopostega brevicaudata is a moth of the family Opostegidae. It is found in the Himalayas.

References

Moths described in 2013
Opostegidae